Linden is a municipality in the district of Kaiserslautern, in Rhineland-Palatinate, western Germany.

Geography 
The community is located on the edge of the biosphere reserve Palatinate Forest. Through Linden flows the Queidersbach, popularly also called Steinalb.  Linden also includes the living spaces Ländler-Hof, Lindener Mühle and Weiherhof.

History 
The place was first mentioned in documents in 1363.

The village Linden belonged from the early 16th to the end of the 18th century to the so-called Grand Court of the rule Landstuhl, which was owned by the barons of Sickingen the line to Hohenburg.

In 1794, the left bank of the Rhine was occupied in the First Coalition War. From 1798 to 1814 Linden belonged to the canton Landstuhl in the department Donnersberg.

Due to the agreements made at the Congress of Vienna, the area first came to Austria in June 1815 and was ceded to the Kingdom of Bavaria in 1816 on the basis of the Treaty of Munich. Under the Bavarian administration Linden belonged from 1817 to the Landkommissariat Homburg in the Rhine district, from 1862 to the district office Homburg, moved in 1929 to the district office Kaiserslautern and belongs since 1939 to the district of Kaiserslautern.

After the Second World War, the community Linden within the French occupation zone was part of the administrative district Pfalz in the then newly formed state Rhineland-Palatinate.

Population Growth 
The development of the population of Linden, the values from 1871 to 1987 are based on censuses:

References

Palatinate Forest
Kaiserslautern (district)